Maurice Steijn (born 20 November 1973) is a Dutch professional football manager and former player. He is the current head coach of Sparta Rotterdam. He formerly worked with ADO Den Haag, VVV-Venlo, Al Wahda FC, and NAC Breda.

Managerial career

ADO Den Haag
Steijn is a Bachelor of Education and has taught in primary education. As a coach, he started as an assistant to Bob Kootwijk at the ADO Den Haag amateur branch and also coached youth teams. After this, he became assistant for the first team and until 30 March 2010 also coached the ADO reserves, before being appointed caretaker manager of the ADO first team after the dismissal of Raymond Atteveld.

After the departure of John van den Brom to Vitesse on 30 June 2011, Steijn was appointed head coach of ADO. On 5 February 2014, after three years as head coach, Steijn was dismissed after a loss against Heracles Almelo, and was succeeded by his assistant, former defender Henk Fräser.

Personal life
Steijn is the father of the Dutch footballer Sem Steijn, and managed his son's debut at VVV-Venlo on 6 December 2018.

Managerial Statistics

References

1973 births
Living people
Dutch footballers
Eredivisie players
Dutch football managers
ADO Den Haag players
NAC Breda players
Eredivisie managers
Eerste Divisie managers
ADO Den Haag managers
VVV-Venlo managers
NAC Breda managers
UAE Pro League managers
Footballers from The Hague
Association football midfielders